The Northern Colorado Water Conservancy District — more commonly referred to as Northern Water — is a water utility for eight counties in northeastern Colorado. Northern Water works with the Colorado-Big Thompson Project to transfer water from the Colorado Western Slope over the Continental Divide for agricultural, industrial, and municipal water supply in northeastern Colorado. The District's offices are in Berthoud, Colorado.

Water supply infrastructure
Northern Water manages numerous water infrastructure projects, including reservoirs, pipelines and tunnels, dams, hydroelectric plants, and feeder canals. For example, the Alva B. Adams Tunnel brings water from the Upper Colorado River basin across the mountains to the South Platte River watershed in northern Colorado. Also, Horsetooth Reservoir, west of Fort Collins is among the more well-known reservoirs Northern Water manages.

Northern Integrated Supply Project
The Northern Integrated Supply Project is a project managed by Northern Water which proposes to build two new reservoirs in Northern Colorado. The proposed Glade Reservoir will take and store water from the Cache la Poudre River, and the proposed Galeton Reservoir will pull water from the South Platte River. However, the project faces organized opposition.

Chimney Hollow Reservoir Project
The Chimney Hollow Reservoir Project involves the construction of a new reservoir to store water collected from the Windy Gap Reservoir in Grand County, Colorado. The reservoir, the major component of the Windy Gap Firming Project, a subdivision of Northern Water, will help store water otherwise lost in wet years due to the insufficient capacity of the Windy Gap Reservoir and other reservoirs on Colorado's Western Slope. The reservoir will store water from existing water rights. Construction on the reservoir's two dams (one on the north end and one on the south end) began in 2021, and water will begin flowing into it in 2025. Located just west of Carter Lake in southern Larmier County, the new reservoir will hold  of water, water that will be used for municipal water supply for nine municipalities and three water districts on Colorado's Front Range. The $690 million project is the first major dam to be built in Colorado in twenty years. The reservoir's surface area will be .

Municipal Subdistrict

The Municipal Subdistrict, a subordinate organization of Northern Water, was formed on July 6, 1970. The subdistrict was set up to take advantage of some unallocated Colorado River water that could also be piped over the divide for the benefit of Northern Waters customers. The Windy Gap Project, as it came to be called, provided for the construction of a diversion dam near Granby in Grand County. Now the Windy Gap Reservoir is able to divert about 48,000 acre feet of water each year to users within Northern Water's service area.

Board of Directors
Directors of the Northern Colorado Water Conservancy District represent eight counties in northeastern, Colorado.  

MIKE APPLEGATE
Term Ends: Sept. 28, 2023

BILL EMSLIE
Term Ends: Sept. 28, 2025

JENNIFER GIMBEL
Term Ends: Sept. 28, 2024

SUE ELLEN HARRISON
Term Ends: Sept. 28, 2026

DON MAGNUSON
Term Ends: Sept. 28, 2024

GENE MANUELLO
Term Ends: Sept. 28, 2026

ROB MCCLARY
Term Ends: Sept. 28, 2023

DAVID NETTLES
Term Ends: Sept. 28, 2026

JOHN RUSCH
Term Ends: Sept. 28, 2025

DALE TROWBRIDGE
Term Ends: Sept. 28, 2023

TODD WILLIAMS
Term Ends: Sept. 28, 2025

DENNIS YANCHUNAS
Term Ends: Sept. 28, 2024

See also
 Colorado-Big Thompson Project
 Alva B. Adams Tunnel
 Horsetooth Reservoir
 Windy Gap Reservoir
 Water in Colorado

References

External links
 

Water companies of the United States
Water in Colorado
State agencies of Colorado
1937 establishments in Colorado
Government agencies established in 1937